Andrew Kratzmann and Marcos Ondruska were the defending champions, but Ondruska chose to compete at Beijing during the same week, losing in the first round.

Kratzmann teamed up with Libor Pimek and successfully defended his title, by defeating Hendrik Jan Davids and Daniel Orsanic 3–6, 6–3, 7–6 in the final.

Seeds

Draw

Draw

References

External links
 Official results archive (ATP)
 Official results archive (ITF)

Campionati Internazionali di Sicilia
1997 ATP Tour
Camp